Akhrik Sokratovich Tsveiba (born 10 September 1966) is a former Soviet association footballer.

Career
Tsveiba started his career at FC Dinamo Sukhumi before playing regularly for FC Dinamo Tbilisi. In 1990, he left for FC Dynamo Kyiv, where he was nominated by Ukraine. He then played briefly in Russia before signing with Gamba Osaka. He returned to Russia for FC Alania Vladikavkaz, where he was nominated by Russia. Tsveiba left for the Chinese team Shanghai Pudong, before spending his late career with the Russian teams Uralan Elista and Dynamo Moscow.

In 2009, he was part of the Russian squad that won the 2009 Legends Cup.

International career
He was a non-playing squad member at the 1990 FIFA World Cup for the Soviet Union, and at Euro 1992 for the CIS. Tsveiba played for the Ukraine national team against Hungary in a friendly match in August 1992.

He changed his allegiance to Russia in 1998 FIFA World Cup qualification.

Post-playing career
He worked as a scout with FC Dynamo Moscow when the club was managed by Stanislav Cherchesov from 2014 to 2015.

Personal life
His son Sandro Tsveiba is also a professional footballer.

Club statistics

National team statistics

References

External links

 
 
 
 Akhrik Sokratovich Tsveiba at RSSSF
 

 

1966 births
Living people
People from Gudauta
Footballers from Abkhazia
Georgian emigrants to Russia
Soviet footballers
Soviet Union international footballers
Ukrainian footballers
Ukraine international footballers
Ukrainian expatriate footballers
Russian footballers
Russia international footballers
Russian expatriate footballers
Expatriate footballers in Russia
Ukrainian expatriate sportspeople in Russia
Expatriate footballers in Japan
Ukrainian expatriate sportspeople in Japan
Expatriate footballers in China
Ukrainian expatriate sportspeople in China
Russian expatriate sportspeople in China
Expatriate footballers in Cyprus
Russian expatriate sportspeople in Cyprus
Dual internationalists (football)
1990 FIFA World Cup players
UEFA Euro 1992 players
FC Dinamo Sukhumi players
FC Dinamo Tbilisi players
FC Dynamo Kyiv players
FC Dynamo-2 Kyiv players
FC KAMAZ Naberezhnye Chelny players
Gamba Osaka players
FC Spartak Vladikavkaz players
FC Elista players
FC Dynamo Moscow players
Soviet Top League players
Russian Premier League players
Ukrainian Premier League players
Ukrainian First League players
Cypriot First Division players
Chongqing Liangjiang Athletic F.C. players
J1 League players
FC SKA-Khabarovsk players
Ukrainian people of Abkhazian descent
Russian people of Abkhazian descent
Association football defenders